Honor suicide is a process whereby a person commits suicide to escape the shame of an immoral or dishonorable action, such as having had extra-marital sexual affairs, partaking in a scandal, or suffering defeat in battle. It is distinguished from regular suicide in that the subject is actively deciding to either privately or publicly kill themself for the sake of restoring or protecting honor. Some honor suicides are a matter of personal choice and are devoid of any cultural context. For example, honor suicides have been committed by military figures when faced with defeat, such as Adolf Hitler, Mark Antony, Władysław Raginis, Yoshitsugu Saito, Jozef Gabčík and Hans Langsdorff.  

Japan has a long history of suicide in its culture. Seppuku is a type of ritual suicide that was practiced by samurai to avoid the shame of being held prisoner.  In World War II, both banzai charges and kamikaze attacks were suicide attacks used during the Pacific War. Suicides in Japan are also often used to atone for wrongdoing and self-disappointment.

See also 
 Honor killing
 Forced suicide
 Seppuku
 Jauhar

References

Honor
Suicide types